Shusha Chess 2022 - The international chess tournament “Shusha Chess 2022” dedicated to the 190th anniversary of prominent poet and philanthropist Khurshidbanu Natavan was held in Shusha, Azerbaijan on September 21–25, 2022.

About tournament  
The organizers of the Tournament are the Ministry of Youth and Sport of the Azerbaijan Republic and Azerbaijan Chess Federation. The playing venue of the Tournament is “Karabakh” hotel in Shusha, Azerbaijan. The tournament will be held in two categories – men and women. In each category, 10 players will be invited by the Organizing Committee. The winner of each category of “Shusha Chess 2022” is determined by the total points scored in the rapid and blitz tournaments. Shakhriyar Mamedyarov and Arabidze Meri won the tournament in their categories.

Competitors

Men 
 Mamedyarov Shakhriyar
 Maghsoodloo Parham
 Vidit Santosh Gujrathi
 Radjabov Teimour
 Durarbayli Vasif
 Wang Hao
 Mamedov Rauf
 Kasimdzhanov Rustam
 Mustafa Yilmaz
 Guseinov Gadir

Women 
 Arabidze Meri
 Dzagnidze Nana
 Ozturk Orenli Kubra
 Mammadova Gulnar
 Beydullayeva Govhar
 Efroimski Marsel
 Balajayeva Khanim
 Mammadzada Gunay
 Fataliyeva Ulviyya
 Zawadzka Jolanta

Logo of tournament  

The logo for the “Shusha Chess 2022” international chess tournament, which will be co-organized by the Azerbaijani Youth and Sports Ministry, the Azerbaijan Chess Federation and the Shusha City State Reserve, has been revealed.

According to the Azerbaijan Chess Federation, the official logo takes inspiration from various historical and cultural elements and depicts a combination of such elements as the Shusha Fortress, the Karabakh horse, and the rook – a major piece in chess.

References

External links 
 Official web-site

Chess competitions
Chess in Azerbaijan
Chess memorial tournaments
International sports competitions hosted by Azerbaijan
Shusha District
2022 establishments in Azerbaijan
Recurring sporting events established in 2022